Clarke High School may refer to:
 Clarke High School (Ontario), a school under the jurisdiction of the Kawartha Pine Ridge District School Board in Newcastle, Ontario
 W. Tresper Clarke High School, Westbury, New York
 Clarke Central High School, Athens, Georgia

See also
 Clark High School (disambiguation)
 Clarke County High School (disambiguation)